The National Salvation Front (FSN) was the most important political organization formed during the Romanian Revolution in December 1989, which became the governing body of Romania in the first weeks after the collapse of the totalitarian communist regime. It subsequently became a political party, the largest post-communist party, and won the 1990 election with 66% of the national vote, under the leadership of then-President Ion Iliescu, who was elected with 85% of the vote. 

Iliescu nominated again Petre Roman as the Prime Minister of the first cabinet formed after the first free and fair elections. After the fourth ”mineriadă”, Roman was forced to resign. The controversy between the two national leaders was finalized in 1992, at the national Congress of FSN, when the party split in two: the Democratic National Salvation Front (FDSN), under the leadership of President Iliescu; and FSN, under the leadership of Petre Roman (in 1993, it was the renamed as the Democratic Party (PD).

The National Salvation Front (FSN) founded by Iliescu and Roman was the common root of two of the largest active political parties in post-communist Romania: the Social Democratic Party (PSD) and the Democratic Party (PD, later the Democratic Liberal Party, PDL, after the merger with a splinter group from PNL, the Liberal Democratic Party, PLD). In 2014, the second party (the former PD; then PDL) merged with the ”historical party” National Liberal Party (PNL, founded in 1875, refounded in 1990), and ceased to exist.

History

Formation and rise to power
In March 1989 six prominent members of the Romanian Communist Party (PCR) wrote an open letter to President Nicolae Ceaușescu that criticised his abuses of power and his economic policies. The so-called "Letter of the Six" was circulated in the Western media and read on Radio Free Europe.

In 1989, before the 14th Congress of the Romanian Communist Party, two letters signed "National Salvation Front" began circulating. They were read on Radio Free Europe on 27 August and 8 November. The first letter had a number of questions about Ceaușescu's mismanagement of the economy and human rights violations, while the second letter appealed to the Congress not to re-elect Ceaușescu.

People flocked to the National Salvation Front (FSN) for a multitude of reasons ranging from religious oppression in members such as László Tőkés and alleged mismanagement and marginalization of undesirables within the Communist party in members such as Ion Iliescu.

After the Romanian Revolution, the same name led to the question of whether the National Salvation Front (FSN) existed as an underground organization. According to Silviu Brucan, this was not the case, as the letters were written by Alexandru Melian, a professor at the University of Bucharest, who had no connection to the leaders of the NSF. This was contradicted by Nicolae Militaru, who claimed that he, together with Ion Iliescu, led a clandestine National Salvation Front which asked Melian to write this appeal.

The creation of the FSN was officially announced to the public by Ion Iliescu in radio and TV addresses on 22 December 1989, after the overthrow of Ceaușescu. The FSN took power from the communist authorities. Within four days, the FSN formed an interim government with Ion Iliescu being the president and Petre Roman as the interim Prime Minister. The initial membership of FSN came from diverse backgrounds: intellectuals, students, army officers, but the leaders were mostly former Communist officials (see List of members of the National Salvation Front Council).

Interim government
On 27 December, the FSN decreed the abolition of the one-party system and the calling of free elections. Shortly afterwards, two major political parties claiming to be the successors of the two most important pre-Communist Romanian parties, more specifically the National Peasants' Party (PNŢ) and the National Liberal Party (PNL), were re-founded and registered.

At first, the FSN announced that it would not be nominating candidates in the forthcoming elections. However, Silviu Brucan then launched the concept of the big party and supported the transformation of the FSN into a political party. Some members of FSN, like Dumitru Mazilu, Mircea Dinescu, Ion Caramitru, Andrei Pleșu, Dan Hăulică, Gabriel Liiceanu, or Doina Cornea resigned before FSN became a political party.

On 6 February 1990, the FSN, transformed itself into a political party, in order to be able to run in the upcoming elections. Except for a few newspapers, FSN had extensive control over the Romanian mass-media, particularly the state owned television company and the newly founded Adevărul newspaper.

Anti-FSN demonstrations were mounted by the Christian Democratic National Peasants' Party (PNȚ-CD) and the National Liberal Party (PNL) in late January and late February 1990, that degenerated into violence against state authorities. In turn, Iliescu called on the working class to support the FSN against what he noted as "fascist forces, trying to destabilise the country". This has resulted in what were named the first and second Mineriads.

However FSN agreed to allow other parties to participate in the provisional government. The new governing body, the Provisional Council of National Unity (CPUN), still dominated by FSN, would run the country from early February 1990 until the elections.

Another, much larger, demonstration (the Golaniad) against FSN's participation in the elections was organised in April 1990 and lasted 52 days, until 13–15 June, when it was violently dispersed by the third Mineriad.

First elected government
The FSN had strong support among the peasants and the urban industrial workers, while the PNL and PNŢCD had strong support among the intellectuals in urban areas.

As popular anger was directly primarily at the Ceaușescu family, the FSN benefited from the institutional links of the disbanded Communist Party and needed no specific program in order to win the elections, being a catch-all party.

FSN and its candidate Ion Iliescu comfortably won the legislative and presidential elections on 20 May 1990, obtaining a majority in both the Assembly of Deputies and the Senate. Petre Roman remained Prime Minister, and its government started cautious economic reforms.

Breakup
After growing tensions between Iliescu and Roman, on 7 April 1992, Iliescu and many other members left the FSN and created the Democratic National Salvation Front (FDSN), which eventually developed to be the current Social Democratic Party (PSD).

Petre Roman remained leader of the FSN. On 28 May 1993, the party was renamed Democratic Party – National Salvation Front (PD-FSN), before shortening its name to Democratic Party (PD) in 1998.

Legacy
The National Salvation Front (FSN) has had a major impact on post-1989 Romanian politics. The two parties that emerged from the National Salvation Front (FSN), more specifically the Social Democratic Party (PSD) and the Democratic Liberal Party (PDL), the latter which ultimately merged into the National Liberal Party (PNL) in 2014, governed or participated in government coalitions from 1990 until today.

The former President Traian Băsescu entered politics as an FSN member and served as Minister of Transportation in several FSN governments. It is worth noting what Băsescu, stemming as a presidential candidate from the Democratic Party (PD), as part of the Justice and Truth Alliance (DA), remarked rhetorically in a live TV debate with Adrian Năstase, stemming from the Social Democratic Party (PSD), before the 2004 run-off presidential election: "You know what Romania's greatest curse is right now? It's that Romanians have to choose between two former Communist Party (PCR) members."

Election results

Legislative elections

Presidential elections

References

Bibliography
Dan Pavel, Iulia Huia, <<Nu putem reuşi decît împreună.>> O istorie analitică a Convenţiei Democratice, 1989-2000, Editura Polirom, Iaşi, 2003.
Steven D. Roper, Romania: The Unfinished Revolution, Routledge, 2000, 
Dennis Deletant, Ceaușescu and the Securitate: Coercion and Dissent in Romania, 1965–1989, M.E. Sharpe, London, 1995, .

1989 establishments in Romania
1990 establishments in Romania
1993 disestablishments in Romania
Defunct socialist parties in Romania
Democratic socialist parties in Europe
Organizations of the Revolutions of 1989
Political controversies in Europe
Political parties disestablished in 1993
Political parties established in 1990
Provisional governments
Romanian Revolution
Social democratic parties in Romania